Nisporeni The city is administrative center of the Nisporeni District.

Demographics
Most of the population (80.5%) are Moldovans.

History
The first historical appearance was in 1618.

The Romanian People's Salvation Cross, the largest cross in Moldova, was built in 2011 in Nisporeni.

Sport
Speranța Nisporeni is based in the city.

Media
 Albasat TV
 Vocea Basarabiei, 105,7

Notable people
 Ion Munteanu
 Ciobanu Liandru

International relations

Twin towns – sister cities
Nisporeni is twinned with:

  Lugoj, Romania

Image Gallery

References

 
Cities and towns in Moldova
1618 establishments in Europe
Kishinyovsky Uyezd
Lăpușna County (Romania)
Ținutul Nistru
Nisporeni District